The 2018 Le Samyn was the 49th edition of Le Samyn road cycling one day race. It was part of UCI Europe Tour in category 1.1.

Teams
Twenty-one teams were invited to take part in the race. These included three UCI World Tour teams, eleven UCI Professional Continental teams and seven UCI Continental teams.

General classification

External links

References

Lesamyn
Lesamyn